113th meridian may refer to:

113th meridian east, a line of longitude east of the Greenwich Meridian
113th meridian west, a line of longitude west of the Greenwich Meridian